Zsolt Németh (born 9 November 1971 in Szombathely, Vas) is a retired male hammer thrower from Hungary. His personal best throw was 81.56 metres, achieved in August 1999 in Veszprém. He is the son of coach Pál Németh.

Achievements

Awards
 Hungarian athlete of the Year (1): 1999

References

 
 

1971 births
Living people
Hungarian male hammer throwers
Athletes (track and field) at the 1996 Summer Olympics
Athletes (track and field) at the 2000 Summer Olympics
Olympic athletes of Hungary
Sportspeople from Szombathely
World Athletics Championships medalists
Universiade medalists in athletics (track and field)
Universiade gold medalists for Hungary
20th-century Hungarian people
21st-century Hungarian people